Bali is a village in the Indian state of Uttar Pradesh. It is located in the Baghpat block of the Baghpat district.

Administration 

The village is administered by a Panchayat. In 2021 the Sarpanch (village chief) at present smt Poonam Devi. He has served from 2016-2021

Economy 

Agriculture is the main occupation. Major crops include sugarcane, wheat and rice. Vegetables including gourds, pumpkins, potatoes, ladyfinger, spinach, radish and carrots are cultivated. Some villagers work at Baghpat Cooperative Sugar Mills, one-half km from Baghpat city.

Education 

The village has four schools: Sardar Vallabhbhai Patel School, Shaeedh Manveer National School and two Govt. schools. Sunil coaching classes are there. The nearest colleges are located in neighbouring towns Agarwal mandi tatiri, Baghpat and Baraut, and Baghpat.

Facilities 
The village has a small hospital; neighbouring Baraut is home to Aastha Multi-speciality hospital. Several bigger hospitals are located in Baghpat. Sarvodaya hospital ks located in Tatari village.

Transport 
Baghpat road Railway Station is 2 km from the village.

Culture 
Temples include Shiv mandir, Baba mohan ram mandir Devi mandir, Balmikhi mandir, Ravidas mandir, and Mata mandir.

Demographics 

As of the 2011 India census, Bali had a population of 5,005 including 2,670 males and 2,335 females. Its literacy rate of 76.74% was above the state average. The literacy is higher among males (87.84%) than females (64.16%). Mandaar clan of Gurjars form the majority of the population.

References 

Villages in Bagpat district